Emese Sáfrány (born 6 August 1988), known by her stage name Aleska Diamond, is a Hungarian acrobat, instructor, former pornographic actress, and former call girl. She won the AVN Award for female foreign performer of the year in 2012 and 2013.

Career
Diamond started to work in the porn business in 2008. In 2012 and 2013, she won the AVN Award for female foreign performer of the year. She left the industry in 2013 (although she was still contractually obliged to perform in 2014), and has since been professionally working as an instructor for aerial acrobatics, as well as competing professionally. She earned a silver medal in aerial hoop at the 2016 World Championship of Air Power Athletics in Riga.

Awards and nominations

References

External links
 
 
 
 
 

1988 births
21st-century Hungarian actresses
Escorts
Exercise instructors
Female acrobatic gymnasts
Hungarian female adult models
Hungarian pornographic film actresses
Hungarian prostitutes
Living people
People from Komló
Women memoirists